The 2001 Pan American Race Walking Cup was held in Cuenca, Azuay, Ecuador on 27–28 October.  The track of the Cup runs in the Avenida España, Parque Calderón.

The event was held jointly with the South American Race Walking Championships, featuring the men's 35 kilometres race rather than the 50 kilometres.

Complete results,  medal winners until 2011, and the results for the Mexican athletes were published.

Medallists

Results

Men's 20 km

Team

Men's 50 km

Team

Women's 20 km

Team

Participation
The participation of 59 athletes from 9 countries is reported.

 (2)
 (8)
 (4)
 (2)
 (12)
 México (15)
 Perú (1)
 (1)
 (12)

See also
 2001 Race Walking Year Ranking

References

Pan American Race Walking Cup
Pan American Race Walking Cup
Pan American Race Walking Cup
International athletics competitions hosted by Ecuador